Automatism may refer to:

Automatic behavior, spontaneous verbal or motor behavior
Automatism (law), a defense used in criminal law
Automatism (toxicology), when an individual repeatedly takes a medication because the individual forgets previous doses
Automatic writing, the process, or product, of writing material that does not come from the conscious thoughts of the writer
Surrealist automatism, an art technique
Automatism (medicine), repetitive unconscious gestures, such as lip smacking, in certain types of epilepsy

See also
Automatic (disambiguation)